Joseph Pickett Johnson Jr. (December 12, 1931 – August 5, 2022) was an American lawyer and politician of the Democratic Party. He was a member of the Virginia House of Delegates from 1966 to 1969, and again from 1990 until 2014. He  represented the 4th district in the southwest part of the state, including the city of Bristol and parts of Smyth and Washington Counties from 1992 to 2014.

Johnson ran unsuccessfully for the United States House of Representatives in 1968, losing the 9th congressional district race to the Republican incumbent, William C. Wampler.

Johnson announced that he would not run for reelection in 2013.

Personal life
Johnson was married to the former Mary Ann Allison for 64 years, until her death on July 19, 2022. They had three children: Mary Jo (Neal), Joseph Pickett III, and Sage. Johnson died on August 5, 2022, aged 90, less than three weeks after his wife; six grandchildren: Mary Lewis Huffman (Neal), Ashley Brooke Hemmer (Johnson), Mary Catherine Clark (Johnson), Joseph Zachary Johnson, Finn Alexander Johnson, William Pickett Johnson; and three great grandchildren: Emma Grace Clark, Isley Ann Clark and Joseph Beckett Johnson.

Electoral history

Notes

References

External links

1931 births
2022 deaths
20th-century American politicians
21st-century American politicians
Candidates in the 1968 United States elections
Emory and Henry College alumni
Democratic Party members of the Virginia House of Delegates
Military personnel from Virginia
People from Washington County, Virginia
Place of death missing
United States Air Force personnel of the Korean War
University of Richmond School of Law alumni
Virginia lawyers